Joanna Aizenberg (born 1960) is a professor of chemistry and chemical biology at Harvard University. She is the Amy Smith Berylson Professor of Materials Science at Harvard's School of Engineering and Applied Sciences, the co-director of the Kavli Institute for Bionano Science and Technology and a core faculty member of the Wyss Institute for Biologically Inspired Engineering. She is a prominent figure in the field of biologically inspired materials science, having authored 90 publications and holding 25 patents.

Education

Aizenberg received her B.S. degree in chemistry and her M.S. degree in physical chemistry from Moscow State University in 1981 and 1984 respectively, and her Ph.D. degree in structural biology from the Weizmann Institute of Science in 1996.

Career
She did her postdoctoral research with George Whitesides at Harvard University, investigating micro/nanofabrication and near-field optics. In 1998, she joined Bell Labs as a member of the technical staff where she has made a number of pioneering contributions, including developing new biomimetic approaches for the synthesis of ordered mineral films with highly controlled shapes and orientations, and discovering unique biological optical systems that outperform technological analogs, as well as characterizing the associated organic molecules.

In 2007, Aizenberg joined the Harvard School of Engineering and Applied Sciences.

The lab's research investigates a wide range of topics that include biomimetics, self-assembly, adaptive materials, crystal engineering, surface wettability, nanofabrication, biooptics, biomaterials, and biomechanics.

In 2019, Aizenberg was elected into the National Academy of Engineering for contributions to the understanding of biological systems and bioinspired materials design.

Awards
 Elected to the National Academy of Engineering, 2019
 Elected to the National Academy of Sciences, 2019
Elected to the American Philosophical Society (2016)
Elected to the American Academy of Arts and Sciences (2014)
Ronald Breslow Award for the Achievement in Biomimetic Chemistry, ACS 2008
Industrial Innovation Award, American Chemical Society, 2007
Outstanding Women Scientists Award, Indiana University, 2006
Lucent Chairman's Award, 2005
Pedersen Award Lecture, DuPont, 2005
ACS PROGRESS Lectureship Award, University of Wisconsin at Madison, 2004
Distinguished Women Scientists Lectureship, University of Texas at Austin, 2003
New Investigator Award in Chemistry and Biology of Mineralized Tissues, 2001
Arthur K. Doolittle Award of the American Chemical Society (ACS), 1999
Award of the Max-Planck Society in Biology and Materials Science, Germany, 1995

References

External links
Aizenberg Group at Harvard
Harvard Magazine portrait: Joanna Aizenberg
Ted Talk - Extreme Biomimetics

Living people
21st-century American chemists
John A. Paulson School of Engineering and Applied Sciences faculty
Moscow State University alumni
Members of the American Philosophical Society
Fellows of the American Academy of Arts and Sciences
Members of the United States National Academy of Sciences
1960 births
Weizmann Institute of Science alumni
Members of the United States National Academy of Engineering
Fellows of the American Physical Society